The Triggerman beat, also known as Triggaman, is a one-bar drum loop that originated from sampling "Drag Rap" by the Showboys and "Brown Beats" by Cameron Paul. The one-bar drum loop and bells was known to be used in bounce music, having been used in hundreds of records. The beat has been influential in recent hip hop music, including T.I. and Lil Wayne's "Ball", Drake's "Nice for What" and "In My Feelings", Juvenile's Back That Thang Up, David Banner's Like a Pimp and also "Go Crazy" by Chris Brown and Young Thug.

Drag Rap 
The first beat was created by Orville 'Buggs Can Can' Hall and Phillip 'Triggerman' Price, who went by the name the Showboys, for the song "Drag Rap" on Priority Records. In a studio in Hollis, Queens New York named power Perk where owner and engineer Brian Perkins played all of the keyboards, it is regarded as "a classic story rap that lifts both its sonic and structural cues directly from Dragnet." The song references three popular commercials of that period including Wendy's Where's the Beef, Old Spice's sea shanty jingle, and Irish Spring soap, the idea for the Old Spice whistle was suggested by Jam Master Jay. The production includes beatboxing, a xylophone riff and the 'bones' piano loop which was manually played out for 6 minutes because of some of the studio equipment was malfunctioning. The 808 drum machine, instrumental ostinato arpeggio pattern, "all right all right" vocal ad libs, vocal clips, five variation of drum rolls, and the 'bones' piano loop were part of what has been frequently sampled. 

The record had buzz for its first month of being released in New York City but was largely a flop  until it was later discovered in the southern hip hop community being first used by Memphis based DJ Spanish Fly on the song "Trigga Man". The second song to use the triggerman beat was Kevin 'MC. T. Tucker and DJ Irv's "Where Dey At" released in 1991. Before releasing his record sampling Drag Rap, Tucker had bought the record at a Sam Goody during a trip to New York in 1986. After playing Drag Rap back in New Orleans he claimed the song could be run for up to four hours straight at a time. DJ Irv would loop the song on two turntables while chants would be added by the MC. It was then recorded on cassettes known as "red tapes" and given to local radio stations being added into rotation. DJ Jimi used the beat the following year on "Where They At", a follow up record of sorts, which helped to spread the popularity in the local bounce scene. Labels like Cash Money Records began releasing several recordings with the beat including Magnolia Shorty,  U.N.L.V., DJ Jubilee, and Ms. Tee. 

The Showboys learned of the record's popularity down south after Chuck D contacted them informing he heard the record being played in Memphis and later a local Memphis concert promoter reaching out to have the duo perform Drag Rap live. The label had initially lied to promoters who wanted to book the artists saying they were dead or in jail so more royalties could be collected out of the artists pocket. After the rumours were dispelled the duo began performing in the south.

Brown Beats and Rock the Beat 
As the beat evolved it commonly would also sample the drum pattern of Cameron Paul's "Brown Beats" or Derek B's Rock the Beat co-produced by Simon Harris, both were  released in 1987. Brown Beats was from 'Beats and Pieces' a DJ tools series with beats and breaks which Paul produced, the song name derives from having sampled James Brown's The Boss and Get Up Offa That Thing. The popularity of its use derived from Mannie Fresh and its first use which he produced for Cheeky Blakk which itself became known as the "Cheeky Blakk beat". Fresh gave praise to Brown Beats and Drag Rap and would go on to be part of his inspiration for the production on the southern hip hop classic "Back That Thang Up".

There has been debate as to who created the Brown Beats drum pattern first as both records were released in 1987. Paul was a bay area DJ in 1980s and 1990s, while Derek B and Simon Harris were a rapper and producer based in England. Both parties were prone to sampling older funk and hip hop records to use as club edits but their geographical distances from New Orleans left somewhat of a mystery for the origin. Since their respective releases other mixtapes and DJ mashups have created variations of the beat such as DJ Money Fresh's "Brown Beats".

References

Music looping
Music of New Orleans